Howie is a common name for people:
 Howie (given name)
 Howie, surname

Howie may also refer to:

In other uses:
 Howie (TV series), a 1992 American television series
 Howie, Alberta, a community in Canada
 Howies, British clothing brand